Jacquelyn Mills is a Canadian documentary filmmaker. She is best known for her films In the Waves and Geographies of Solitude.

Early life 
Mills was born in Sydney, Nova Scotia.

Career 
In 2008, Mills' short film, For Wendy, won 5 international awards.

Mills' first documentary (60') In the Waves is a personal exploratory film made in collaboration with her grandmother. The film premiered at Visions du Réel in 2017.  In the Waves won the award for Best Documentary and best editing at the 2017 Atlantic Film Festival and was selected as best medium-length documentary at RIDM (Montreal International Documentary Festival).. It also won Grand Jury Prize at New Hampshire International Film Festival. The film was a shortlisted nominee for the Vancouver Film Critics Circle Award for Best Canadian Documentary at the Vancouver Film Critics Circle Awards 2017.

Geographies of Solitude, Mills second documentary (103'), premiered at Berlinale Forum in 2022 and centers on environmentalist Zoe Lucas and her life on Sable Island. The film won the award for Best Canadian Feature Documentary at the 2022 Hot Docs Canadian International Documentary Festival. Mills was also awarded the Earl A. Glick emerging Canadian filmmaker award. The film has won 19 international awards and was nominated for an IDA.

In addition to her own films, Mills has also worked as a cinematographer and editor on many internationally acclaimed films.

Personal life 
Mills currently lives in Montreal.

References

External links

Canadian documentary film directors
Canadian women film directors
Film directors from Nova Scotia
Living people
People from Sydney, Nova Scotia
Year of birth missing (living people)
Canadian women documentary filmmakers
Canadian cinematographers
Canadian women cinematographers